Michael Dalton McLean (2 December 1880 – 12 August 1958) was elected a Conservative member of the House of Commons of Canada. He was born in Nova Scotia and became a foreman.

McLean won the Kootenay East riding in the July 1930 general election, but resigned on 7 August 1930 to open the seat for Henry Herbert Stevens whom Prime Minister R. B. Bennett appointed Minister of Trade and Commerce. McLean accepted an unspecified federal appointment.

References

External links
 

1880 births
1958 deaths
Members of the House of Commons of Canada from British Columbia
Conservative Party of Canada (1867–1942) MPs